FFX may stand for:
 Final Fantasy X, a role-playing video game developed by Square
 Fairfax County, Virginia
 Fairfax, Virginia
 Fairfax Connector, a public bus service in Fairfax County, Virginia
 Mozilla Firefox, a web browser
 Future Frigate eXperimental, a South Korean government plan